Yuri Schukin was the defending champion but chose to compete in Bordeaux instead.
Diego Junqueira won this tournament. He defeated João Souza 6–3, 6–4 in the final.

Seeds

Draw

Finals

Top half

Bottom half

External Links 
Main Draw
Qualifying Singles

Zagreb Open - Singles
Zagreb Open